WKVL (850 AM, "104.9 Lake FM") is a radio station licensed to Maryville, Tennessee, United States. The station serves the Knoxville area. The station is currently owned by Loud Media.

850 AM is a United States clear-channel frequency.  WKVL must leave the air from sunset to sunrise to avoid interference with the skywave signal of the dominant Class A station - KOA in Denver, Colorado.  KICY in Nome, Alaska is the other Class A station on this frequency.

History
This station was country music WIVK in the 1970s, simulcasting WIVK-FM because it lacked a nighttime signal. In the mid-1980s, it was adult contemporary WHIG but later returned to the WIVK simulcast. Then it was all news while WUTK, owned by the University of Tennessee.

On July 2, 2010, the classic country music returned to the airwaves. The station targeted 1950s through 1980s country. The local lineup included Bob Lewellyn, Eddie Beacon, Tee Blackman and newcomer Tim Byrd.

Blount Media’s ownership (2013-2022)
In May 2013, Blount Broadcasting Corporation, owner of WKVL and WLOD, entered into a time brokerage agreement with Oak Ridge FM who moved their News/Talk format from WNOX, which they had recently sold. WKVL currently simulcasts with WLOD. On March 31, 2014, WKVL changed formats to classic country. On December 15, 2014, WKVL went silent. On December 14, 2015, WKVL returned to the air with classic country. On June 1, 2018, WKVL changed formats from classic country to sports, branded as "Rocky Top Sports". Effective December 11, 2018, WKVL was licensed to move its community of license from Knoxville to Maryville.

Loud Media (2022-)
On April 15, 2022, it was announced that Blount Broadcasting Corporation had come to an agreement to sell WKVL, its sister station WGAP, and two translators to Loud Media. The sale, at a price of $175,000, was consummated on August 17, 2022. On August 21, 2022, at midnight, WKVL changed formats from sports to variety hits, branded as "Random Music Radio". The first song on “Random Music Radio” was “Mr. Jones” by Counting Crows. On November 24, 2022, WKVL-AM flipped to a simulcast of sister station WPLA.

Previous logo

References

External links

KVL
Radio stations established in 1953
1953 establishments in Tennessee
KVL
Classic hits radio stations in the United States